Ferdowsi, from Persian  فردوسی, also romanized Firdausi, Firdusi, or Firdawsi, may refer to:

People

Hakīm Abul-Qāsim Firdawsī Tūsī, 10th century Persian poet, author of the Shahnameh.
Arash Ferdowsi (b. 1985), cofounder and chief technology officer of Dropbox.
Bobak Ferdowsi (b. 1979), an aerospace engineer who gained brief fame in 2012 as "NASA Mohawk Guy" during the landing of NASA's Curiosity Mars Rover.

Places
 The Ferdowsi Gas Field
 Ferdowsi University, in Mashad.
 Ferdowsi Metro Station, Tehran.
 Ferdowsi Street, Tehran.
 Ferdowsi Street, Tabriz
 Ferdowsi, Narmashir, Kerman Province
 Ferdowsi, North Khorasan

Film
 Ferdowsi directed by Abdolhossein Sepanta (1934)

Organizations
 Ferdowsi Club - a football club.